Dailey is a surname. Notable people with the surname include:
Entertainment
Dan Dailey (1915–1978), American actor and dancer
Irene Dailey (1920–2008), American actress
Peter F. Dailey (1868–1908), American burlesque comedian
Will Dailey (born c.1976), American recording and performing artist

Sports
Bill Dailey (born 1935), American professional baseball player
Bob Dailey (1953–2016), Canadian ice hockey player
Casey Dailey (born 1975), American football player
Doug Dailey (born 1944),  English cyclist
Mary Dailey (1928–1965), All-American League Professional Baseball League player
Quintin Dailey (1961–2010), American professional basketball player
Ted Dailey (1908–1992), American football player 

Other
Dan Dailey (glass artist) (born 1947), American glass artist
Dell L. Dailey, United States Department of State counterterrorism officer
Don Dailey (1956–2013), American computer chess researcher and game programmer
Fred Dailey (born 1946), American farmer
Janet Dailey (1944–2013), American author
John R. Dailey (born 1934), United States Marine Corps general
Joseph S. Dailey (1844–1905), Justice of the Indiana Supreme Court
Mark Dailey (1953–2010), American-born Canadian television journalist
Peter H. Dailey (1930–2018), American advertising executive and U.S. Ambassador to Ireland (1982–1984)
Phyllis Mae Dailey (1919–1976), American nurse and Navy officer
Ulysses Grant Dailey (1885–1961), American surgeon, writer and teacher

See also
 Dailey, Colorado
Daily (disambiguation)
Daley (disambiguation)
Daly (disambiguation)